A Bend in the River is an upcoming film directed by Colin Broderick, produced by Julie Ryan, and starring John Connors, John Duddy, and Kathy Kiera Clarke. Filming took place in Co. Tyrone, Northern Ireland and was completed in April 2018. The film was scheduled to premiere at the 2020 Belfast Film Festival, but the festival was cancelled due to the COVID-19 pandemic.

References

External links 
 

Upcoming English-language films
Upcoming films
Films postponed due to the COVID-19 pandemic